"Nights Are Forever Without You" is a song written by Parker McGee and first recorded by the soft rock duo England Dan & John Ford Coley.  It was released as the second single from their 1976 album Nights Are Forever, following up on their top 10 hit "I'd Really Love to See You Tonight".

Music and lyrics
Billboard contributor Paul Grein described "Nights Are Forever Without You" as a "twanging country number."  Missoulian contributor Sherry Jones described it as a "sentimental ballad of love and loss."  Los Angeles Times critic Dennis Hunt described it as a "soft rock [ballad] with lush harmonies."  Cash Box said that "an excellent arrangement complements ace harmonies from this winning duo." Record World called it "an extraordinary piece of pop in all its splendor" with "great chording and syncopation."

Reception
Kingston Daily Freeman critic Alan Forray suggested that "Nights Are Forever Without You" would become a blockbuster like "I'd Really Love to See You Tonight" and, ignoring some earlier unsuccessful recordings suggested that "never in pop history has a brand new recording act had their first two singles on  the top 40 charts at the same time." Los Angeles Times critic Terry Atkinson rated "Nights Are Forever Without You" as one of the two best songs on Night Are Forever, along with "I'd Really Love to See You Tonight."  The Leader-Post critic Gary Deane described it as an exception to the blandness of most of the Nights Are Forever album.

The song peaked at No. 10 on the U.S. Billboard Hot 100 chart for two weeks and number four on the Easy Listening chart.  It charted very similarly in Canada.  England Dan's brother Jim Seals had a Top 10 song at the same time with "Get Closer."  Along with "I'd Really Love to See You Tonight," "Nights Are Forever Without You" brought England Dan and John Ford Coley into national prominence after more than a decade of singing together.  The duo claimed that the success of this song made them feel more secure after the overnight success of its predecessor.

England Dan and John Ford Coley performed "Nights Are Forever Without You" on The Captain and Tennille TV show on January 24, 1977.

"Nights Are Forever Without You" has been included on several of England Dan and John Ford Coley's compilation albums including 1979's The Best of England Dan and John Ford Coley.  Ottawa Citizen critic Bill Provick called it a "highlight" of The Best of England Dan and John Ford Coley, being "easy on the ears without being hard on the stomach."  Dan Seals (England Dan) later recorded his solo version on the 1998 album In a Quiet Room II.

Chart history

Weekly charts

Year-end charts

Cover versions
 Bob James produced an instrumental jazz cover on his 1977 album BJ4.
 Buck Owens covered "Nights Are Forever Without You" in 1978.  His version reached No. 27 on the Billboard Hot Country Songs chart.  AllMusic critic Stephen Thomas Erlewine described the performance as sounding "disinterested."

References

External links
Lyrics of this song
 

1976 songs
1976 singles
1978 singles
England Dan & John Ford Coley songs
Buck Owens songs
Song recordings produced by Kyle Lehning
Big Tree Records singles
Atlantic Records singles
Songs written by Parker McGee